Michael David Demetriou (born 12 March 1990) is an English footballer who plays as a defender for and captains Newport County. He has played internationally for England C, making his debut against Bermuda on 4 June 2013.

Club career

Early career
Demetriou began his career as a striker, playing for non-league sides Worthing and Bognor Regis Town. He was then invited to join the Glenn Hoddle Academy in Spain, where he was converted into a defender, and had a spell playing for Jerez Industrial.

Eastbourne Borough
On his return to England, Demetriou joined Eastbourne Borough on non-contract terms on 28 January 2011. He made his Conference debut the following day as an 82nd-minute substitute for Steven Masterton in a 1–1 home draw with Grimsby Town, and made nine more appearances over the season.

Kidderminster Harriers
After departing Eastbourne, Demetriou signed a one-year contract with fellow Conference team Kidderminster Harriers on 20 June 2011. He made his debut on 24 September, filling in for Jamille Matt for the final five minutes of a 2–1 win over Mansfield Town at Field Mill. On 7 February 2012, Demetriou extended his contract with Kidderminster until the end of the 2013–14 season.

He got his first goal on 4 September 2012, a last-minute equaliser away to Braintree Town via a 20-yard strike called a "stunner" by the Essex Chronicle. The following 12 January, he scored his only other goal for the Harriers, a free kick to open a 2–0 win in the season's trip to Mansfield.

Shrewsbury Town
Demetriou made the step up to the Football League, joining League Two side Shrewsbury Town on a free transfer following the expiry of his Kidderminster deal, on a two-year contract on 3 June 2014. He scored the winning goal on his debut, against Tranmere Rovers on 16 August 2014, and subsequently scored on two further occasions that season, an injury-time equaliser in a 2–1 win at Carlisle United, and a consolation against Northampton Town, as Shrewsbury lost by the same score and ended an unbeaten home record in the league.

Demetriou was a first-team regular Playing in the leftback / left wing back role as Shrewsbury won promotion back to League One at the first attempt, and also getting through to the 4th round of the League Cup. Their promotion was secured after a 1–0 away win at Cheltenham Town on 25 April 2015.

On 1 September 2015, Demetriou signed a half-season loan deal with League Two's Cambridge United. Hours later, he made his debut, playing the entirety of a 0–2 home defeat to Dagenham & Redbridge in the first round of the Football League Trophy and was awarded 'Man of the Match' by the official sponsors, an award he went on to win again during a number of appearances and also making The Football League's 'Team of the day' on a few occasions during his time there.

After returning to Shrewsbury, Demetriou made his first League One start of the season away to Millwall on 9 April 2016. When goalkeeper Mark Halstead was sent off with a minute remaining and no substitutions remained, Demetriou volunteered to take over in goal to face Lee Gregory's penalty; he guessed the right way but did not save it, and Shrewsbury lost 3–1. After picking up a knee injury (torn meniscus) just 10 minutes in to the same match, although playing the full 90 minutes on it he was later ruled out of action for the rest of the season. When he was subsequently released, he then broke his 5th metatarsal whilst at Fleetwood Town in the preseason of 2016 and was out of action until January 2017.

Newport County
On 10 January 2017, Demetriou joined League Two side Newport County on a contract until the end of the 2016–17 season. He made his debut for Newport on 21 January 2017 as a second-half substitute in a 0–0 draw versus Barnet in League Two and going on to make a further 16 appearances in the centre back / left sided centre half role. On 1 April 2017 he scored his first goal for Newport in a 1–0 win versus Crawley Town. Demetriou was selected as EFL League Two player of the Month for April 2017, scoring three goals and playing his part in the team that kept four clean sheets that month. Newport, who some deemed down and written off weeks previous, secured their safety from relegation on the last game of the season against Notts County to complete 'The Great Escape'. Demetriou scored a penalty in the 32nd minute of the match and County went on to win 2–1 with fellow central defender Mark O'Brien scoring the winner in the 89th minute.

In May 2017 Demetriou signed a two-year contract to remain at Newport County. Demetriou was part of the team that reached the League Two playoff final at Wembley Stadium on 25 May 2019. Newport lost to Tranmere Rovers, 1-0 after a goal in the 119th minute. He signed a further two-year contract in July 2019. Demetriou played for Newport in the League Two playoff final at Wembley Stadium on 31 May 2021 which Newport lost to Morecambe, 1-0 after a 107th minute penalty. In June 2021 he signed a further two year contract with Newport County.

International career
In November 2014, Demetriou was approached by the Cyprus national football team, to whom he qualifies through a grandfather.

Career statistics

Footnotes

A. "Other" consists of 5 appearances in the Sussex Senior Cup, 2 appearances in the FA Trophy, 2 appearances in the Ryman League Cup, 2 appearances in the Football League Trophy and 1 appearance in the Football Conference National playoffs.

Honours
Shrewsbury Town
Football League Two runner-up: 2014–15

References

External links

1990 births
Living people
English people of Greek Cypriot descent
English footballers
Association football defenders
Sportspeople from Worthing
Worthing F.C. players
Bognor Regis Town F.C. players
Jerez Industrial CF players
Eastbourne Borough F.C. players
Kidderminster Harriers F.C. players
Shrewsbury Town F.C. players
Cambridge United F.C. players
Newport County A.F.C. players
English Football League players
National League (English football) players
People from Worthing (district)